The Niger Cup (Coupe nationale du Niger) is the national football competition, on a knock-out-basis in Niger. It was founded in 1974. The most successful club is Sahel SC with 12 titles. The current champions are US GN, who won their first title in 2021.

Niger Cup Finals

Performance by club

References
Niger - List of Cup Winners, RSSSF.com

Football competitions in Niger
Niger